Kristen Stadtlander (born August 7, 1995) is an American professional wrestler, better known by the ring name Kris Statlander. She is currently signed to All Elite Wrestling, and has also performed on the independent circuit. She is currently inactive due to suffering a knee injury.

Early life and training 

Statlander was born in West Islip, New York on Long Island. After working professionally as a stunt double, she began her professional wrestling training under Pat Buck and Curt Hawkins at the Create A Pro Wrestling Academy in Hicksville, New York in 2016. Statlander later became the first female graduate of the academy. She previously dated fellow AEW wrestler Max Caster.

Professional wrestling career 
Statlander made her professional wrestling debut in November 2016. Statlander made an appearance for WWE on an episode of SmackDown Live that aired on April 9, 2019, teaming with Karissa Rivera in a losing effort against the then-WWE Women's Tag Team Champions Billie Kay and Peyton Royce. In June that same year, she competed at an event for the promotion Beyond Wrestling in an intergender match against Joey Janela in a losing effort.

Statlander made her debut for All Elite Wrestling (AEW) on November 19, 2019, competing in a tag team match alongside Big Swole against Riho and Britt Baker on Dark, where Statlander and Swole were defeated. In December, AEW announced that Statlander had signed with the promotion. Following her signing, she defeated Baker on the December 18 episode of Dynamite to become the No. 1 contender for the AEW Women's World Championship. She made her final appearance for Create A Pro Wrestling, the promotion under which she trained, on December 20. Statlander competed against Riho for the AEW Women's World title on the January 8, 2020, episode of Dynamite, where she was defeated due to interferences by Brandi Rhodes, Awesome Kong, Mel, and the debuting Luther. She received another opportunity to compete for the title on February 29, 2020, at Revolution, this time against new champion Nyla Rose, where she was once again defeated. In June 2020, Statlander suffered an ACL injury in her left leg during an episode of Dynamite.

Statlander returned alongside Trent Beretta on March 31, 2021, helping Chuck Taylor and Orange Cassidy defeat Miro and Kip Sabian on Dynamite, effectively joining Best Friends. In September at All Out, she challenged Baker for the AEW Women's World Championship but was unsuccessful. In November, Statlander, along with the rest of Best Friends, joined the New Japan Pro-Wrestling-based stable Chaos. In August 2022 Statlander suffered a completely torn ACL and lateral meniscus in her right leg during a match on AEW Dark and stated she would need an indefinite amount of time to recover.

Professional wrestling style and persona 
Statlander originally employed an alien gimmick, which she attributed to her being "a big science nerd". Under this character, she was nicknamed "The Galaxy's Greatest Alien" and billed as having come from the Andromeda Galaxy. Statlander changed her gimmick in 2022 since she felt that with the previous gimmick "I was never really being fully taken seriously", calling the previous character as "too fun, too lovable, I guess, too goofy and easygoing".

Statlander uses a 450° splash and an inverted piledriver as finishers, respectively called Area 451 and the Big Bang Theory. With her change in gimmick, Big Bang Theory was renamed Friday Night Fever, referring to the song "More Than a Woman" by the Bee Gees, which was her theme early in her career.

Championships and accomplishments 
AAW Wrestling
AAW Women's Championship (1 time)
Create A Pro Wrestling
CAP Television Championship (1 time)
Inaugural CAP TV Championship Tournament (2019)
Beyond Wrestling
Treasure Hunter Tournament (2019)
IndependentWrestling.TV
Independent Wrestling Championship (1 time)
New York Wrestling Connection
NYWC Starlet Championship (1 time)
Pro Wrestling Illustrated
Ranked No. 26 of the top 150 female wrestlers in the PWI Women's 100 in 2021
Sports Illustrated
Ranked No. 6 of the top 10 women's wrestlers in 2019
Victory Pro Wrestling
VPW Women's Championship (2 times)
Women Superstars United
WSU World Championship (1 time)
Interim WSU World Championship (1 time)
WSU Spirit Championship (1 time)

References

External links 
 
 

1995 births
Living people
People from West Islip, New York
All Elite Wrestling personnel
American female professional wrestlers
Professional wrestlers from New York (state)
Sportspeople from Suffolk County, New York
21st-century American women
21st-century professional wrestlers
AAW Women's Champions